Multistars is an annual international Combined track and field events competition held in Lana, Italy in late April or early May as part of the IAAF World Combined Events Challenge. Established in 1988 the meeting took place in Desenzano del Garda until 2012. From 2013 to 2018 the event moved to Luigi Ridolfi Stadium in Florence before it moved once again to its current location. International athletes compete in the decathlon for men and heptathlon for women.

2013 edition
The 2013 edition was capped by other invitational competitions. With a time of 39.09 Yadisleidy Pedroso set a new Italian best in 300m hurdles.

2020 edition
The 2020 edition was cancelled due to the COVID-19 pandemic.

Past winners
Key:

Medalists since 2009

Men

Women

Records

References

List of winners
Multistars The Winners 1988/2011. Multistars. Retrieved on 2012-05-18.

External links
Official website

Decathlon
Annual track and field meetings
Recurring sporting events established in 1988
World Athletics Combined Events Tour
Athletics competitions in Italy